Alan Ashford (born 31 December 1944) was an English cricketer who played for Cornwall. He was born in Cheam.

Ashford made his cricketing debut for Somerset Second XI during the 1975 season.

Ashford's only List A appearance came during the 1977 season, against Lancashire. From the middle order, he scored 5 runs.

Ashford bowled 7 overs in the match, conceding 34 runs.

External links
Alan Ashford at Cricket Archive 

1944 births
Living people
English cricketers
Cornwall cricketers